Cultures from pre-history to modern times constructed domed dwellings using local materials. Although it is not known when or where the first dome was created, sporadic examples of early domed structures have been discovered. Brick domes from the ancient Near East and corbelled stone domes have been found from the Middle East to Western Europe. These may indicate a common source or multiple independent traditions. A variety of materials have been used, including wood, mudbrick, or fabric. Indigenous peoples around the world produce similar structures today.

Early domes 

The earliest domes were likely domed huts made from saplings, reeds, or timbers and covered with thatch, turf, or skins. Materials may have transitioned to rammed earth, mud-brick, or more durable stone as a result of local conditions. The earliest discovered remains of domed constructions may be four small dwellings made of Mammoth tusks and bones. The first was found by a farmer in Mezhirich, Ukraine, in 1965 while he was digging in his cellar and archaeologists unearthed three more. They date from 19,280–11,700 BC.

More recently, semi-subterranean dwellings of the Thule people, ancestors of the Inuit who were established in the Canadian Arctic by 1300 AD, were made of whalebone frames lashed together with hide straps in a parabolic dome shape covered with hides and blocks of sod and snow. The igloo, a shelter built from blocks of ice in a spiral, was used by the Inuit. The wigwam was made by Native Americans and covered with hides or bark.

In developing countries, domes are often less expensive alternatives to flat or sloped-roofed construction because they use less material to enclose a given volume and provide a lower rate of heat transfer due to the reduced surface area. Domes made with loam are found in Europe, Asia, and Africa, almost always using mud-bricks or adobes. A way of building them without centering called the Persian dome technique has been used for centuries in Afghanistan. Although descended from a longer tradition, the examples of clay brick beehive domes at Harran, Turkey, have been dated to the 19th century AD, as are the dry stone trulli of Italy. The Efé people of central Africa construct similar structures, using leaves as shingles. The Himba people of Namibia construct "desert igloos" of wattle and daub for use as temporary shelters at seasonal cattle camps, and as permanent homes by the poor. Extraordinarily thin domes of sun-baked clay 20 feet in diameter, 30 feet high, and nearly parabolic in curve, are known from Cameroon. Turkic and Mongolian nomads have used domed tents covered in felt for at least a thousand years in central Asia, and to the early 1900s they were used from Anatolia to Mongolia.

The historical development from structures like these to more sophisticated domes is not well documented. That the dome was known to early Mesopotamia may explain the existence of domes in both China and the West in the first millennium BC. Another explanation, however, is that the use of the dome shape in construction did not have a single point of origin and was common in virtually all cultures long before domes were constructed with enduring materials.

Ancient Near East 

Small domes in corbelled stone or brick over round-plan houses go back to the Neolithic period in the ancient Near East, and served as dwellings for poorer people throughout the prehistoric period, but domes did not play an important role in monumental architecture. The discoveries of seal impressions in the ancient site of Chogha Mish (c. 6800 to 3000 BC), located in the Susiana plains of Iran, in the vicinity of the modern city of Dezful in Khuzestan province, show the extensive use of dome structures in mud-brick and adobe buildings, likely granaries. Other examples of mud-brick buildings that also seemed to employ the "true" dome technique have been excavated at Tell Arpachiyah, a Mesopotamian site of the Halaf (c. 6100 to 5400 BC) and Ubaid (ca. 5300 to 4000 BC) cultures. Excavations at Tell al-Rimah have revealed pitched-brick domical vaults from about 2000 BC.

At the Sumerian Royal Cemetery of Ur, a "complete rubble dome built over a timber centring" was found among the chambers of the tombs for Meskalamdug and Puabi, dating to around 2500 BC. Set in mud mortar, it was a "true dome with pendentives rounding off the angles of the square chamber." Other small domes can be inferred from the remaining ground plans, such as one in the courtyard of Ur-Nammu's ziggurat, and in later shrines and temples of the 14th century BC. Some monumental Mesopotamian buildings of the Kassite period are thought to have had brick domes, but the issue is unsettled due to insufficient evidence in what has survived of these structures.

A Neo-Assyrian bas-relief from Kuyunjik depicts domed buildings, although remains of such a structure in that ancient city have yet to be identified, perhaps due to the impermanent nature of sun-dried mudbrick construction. However, because the relief depicts the Assyrian overland transport of a carved stone statue, the background buildings most likely refer to a foreign village, such as those at the foothills of the Lebanese mountains. The relief dates to the 8th century BC, while the use of domical structures in the Syrian region may go back as far as the fourth millennium BC. Likewise, domed houses at Shulaveri in Georgia and Khirokitia, Cyprus, date back to around 6000 BC.

Ancient Middle East and Mediterranean 

Ancient stone corbelled domes have been found from the Middle East to Western Europe. Corbelled beehive domes were used as granaries in Ancient Egypt from the first dynasty, in mastaba tombs of the Old Kingdom, as pressure-relieving devices in private brick pyramids of the New Kingdom, and as kilns and cellars. They have been found in brick and in stone. The mastaba tombs of Seneb and of Neferi are examples. A model of a 10th dynasty house has also been found in Rifeh showing the tops of three domes just emerging through the terraced roof.

In an area straddling the borders between Oman, UAE, and Bahrain, stone beehive tombs built above ground called "Hafit graves", or "Mezyat graves", date to the Hafit period between 3200 and 2700 BC. Similar above-ground tombs made of corbelled stone domes have been found in the fourth cataract region of Nubia with dates beginning in the second millennium BC. The "Nubian dome" technique of using a movable guide to lay courses of a spherical dome dates back thousands of years in Upper Egypt.

Examples on the Mediterranean island of Sardinia have been dated to 2500 BC. The nuraghe built between the 17th century BC and the 5th century BC include stone corbelled domes, some of which were covered by a flat roof or terrace. The largest, Nuraghe Is Paras from the 15th century BC, is 11.8 meters tall and spans 6.4 meters.

Minoan free-standing tombs about 4 to 13 meters in diameter are partially preserved on the Messara Plain of Crete. Only the lowest 3 or 4 meters remain standing of structures that may have risen up to 12 meters, but they are generally agreed to have been domed and provide a developmental link between Neolithic round houses and the circular tombs of the Bronze Age. They are dated after the round houses of Chalcolithic western Cyprus and before the Mycenaean "tholoi".

Underground tombs called "treasuries", a term used by Pausanias for the grave of a hero, flourished in Mycenaean Greece between 1500 BC and 1300 BC, increasing in diameter from about 8 meters to about 14 meters in that time. The "Treasury of Atreus", a large Mycenaean tomb covered with a mound of earth, dates to around 1330 BC. It is about 15 meters in diameter and one of several tholos tombs with corbelled domes. Others include the "Treasury of Clytemnestra" and the "Treasury of Minyas". Smaller scale examples from this time can also be found in other parts of southern and western Europe.

Corbelled beehive tombs over square chambers appear in Thrace, the Crimea, and in Etruria in the first millennium BC. Corbelling in the corners created pendentives. Built between the eighth century and the first century BC, particularly around Tarquinia and Cerveteri, thousands of examples of Etruscan domed tombs of Italy have been identified. The Etruscan "Tomb of the Diavolino" at Vetulonia is an example. Wooden domes were evidently used in Etruria on the Italian peninsula from the Archaic period. Reproductions were preserved as rock-cut Etruscan tombs produced until the Roman Imperial period, and paintings at Pompeii show examples of them in the third style and later.

Wooden domes may also have been used in ancient Greece, over buildings such as the Tholos of Epidaurus, which is typically depicted with a shallow conical roof. Evidence for such wooden domes over round buildings in ancient Greece, if they existed, has not survived and the issue is much debated.  The heroon at Stymphalos has been dated to the late Classical or early Hellenistic period and has a round room preceded by a long rectilinear porch. Its layout might have been copied from Mycenaean tholos tombs and, still in use in the Roman period, it has also been suggested as an inspiration or precedent for the Pantheon in Rome.

Hellenistic and pre-Roman domes 
Although they had palaces of brick and stone, the kings of Achaemenid Persia held audiences and festivals in domical tents derived from the nomadic traditions of central Asia. They were likely similar to the later tents of the Mongol Khans. Called "Heavens", the tents emphasized the cosmic significance of the divine ruler. They were adopted by Alexander the Great after his conquest of the empire, and the domed baldachin of Roman and Byzantine practice was presumably inspired by this association.

Simple domical mausoleums existed in the Hellenistic period. The possible use of domed ceilings in the architecture of Ptolemaic Egypt is suggested by rock-cut tombs in Alexandria and by a poem from a third century BC papyrus that references a fountain niche covered with a semi-dome.

The earliest physical evidence of a Hellenistic dome is at the North Baths of Morgantina in Sicily, dated to the mid third century BC. The dome measured 5.75 metres in diameter over the circular hot room of the baths. It was made of terracotta tubes partially inserted into each other and arranged in parallel arches that were then completely covered with mortar. Iron pins were used to connect some of the tubes horizontally. It is also the earliest known example of this technique of tubular vault construction. A Hellenistic bathing complex in nearby Syracuse may also have used domes like these to cover its circular rooms. The domes are contemporaneous with Archimedes, and the technique of their construction may be related to his method of analyzing spheres as a series of parallel truncated cone segments. The ship Syracusia, built for Hiero II of Syracuse and construction of which was overseen by Archimedes, included a domed library.

In the city of Pergamon, there are remains of stone apsidal semi-domes from the second century BC. The earliest evidence for dressed stone domes with voussoirs comes from the first century BC in the region of Palestine, Syria, and southern Anatolia, the "heartland of Oriental Hellenism". A stone pendentive dome is known from a first century BC bath in Petra.

The Scythians built domed tombs, as did some Germanic tribes in a paraboloid shape. In the Saar basin of the Germanic north of Europe, the domical shape was used in wooden construction over houses, tombs, temples, and city towers, and was translated into masonry construction only after the beginning of Roman rule.

The remains of a large domed circular hall measuring 17 meters in diameter in the Parthian capital city of Nyssa has been dated to perhaps the first century AD. It "shows the existence of a monumental domical tradition in Central Asia that had hitherto been unknown and which seems to have preceded Roman Imperial monuments or at least to have grown independently from them." It likely had a wooden dome. The room "contained a portrait of Mithradates II and, along with other structures at the site, hosted some sort of cult activities connected to the memory of the kings of kings." The Sun Temple at Hatra appears to indicate a transition from columned halls with trabeated roofing to vaulted and domed construction in the first century AD, at least in Mesopotamia. The domed sanctuary hall of the temple was preceded by a barrel vaulted iwan, a combination that would be used by the subsequent Persian Sasanian Empire. An account of a Parthian domed palace hall from around 100 AD in the city of Babylon can be found in the Life of Apollonius of Tyana by Philostratus. The hall was used by the king for passing judgments and was decorated with a mosaic of blue stone to resemble the sky, with images of gods in gold. A bulbous Parthian dome can be seen in the relief sculpture of the Arch of Septimius Severus in Rome, its shape apparently due to the use of a light tent-like framework.

Ancient China

In ancient Chinese architecture, the use of brick vaults and domes in aboveground structures is unknown, while in later periods corbelled domes were built in some aboveground temples and tombs. However, underground tombs dating to the Han dynasty (202 BC – 220 AD) have been discovered and often feature archways, vaulted chambers and domed ceilings. These underground vaults and domes did not require buttress supports since they were held in place by earthen pits. The continued use of domed ceilings in underground tomb architecture can be seen at sites such as the Baisha Tomb near Gongyi, Henan province, dated to the Song dynasty (960–1279 AD), which features two chambers with conical ceilings.

See also
 History of early modern period domes

References

Bibliography 

 
 
 
 
 
 
 
 
 
 
 
 
 
 
 
 
 
 
 
 
 
 
 
 
 
 
 
 
 
 

 
 
 
 
 
 
 
 
 
 
 
 
 
 

Domes
Arches and vaults
Architectural elements
Domes
Ceilings
Roofs